The Eclipse 400 (formerly Eclipse Concept Jet, or ECJ) is a single-engine very light jet that was designed by Eclipse Aviation and Swift Engineering.

A development of the Eclipse 500, the Eclipse 400 prototype first flew in 2007 and was cancelled when the Eclipse company went bankrupt in 2008.

Design and development

The Eclipse 400  was first publicly unveiled on 23 July 2007 at AirVenture as the Eclipse Concept Jet (ECJ). The aircraft was intended to compete with the Cirrus Vision SF50, the Piper PA-47 PiperJet, the Epic Victory, and the Diamond D-Jet in the single-engine jet market. The Eclipse 400 design featured one engine, four seats and a V-tail similar to the Cirrus Jet.

The four-seat prototype, registered N5184U, is powered by a single Pratt & Whitney Canada PW610F turbofan, first flown on 2 July 2007. It was built in complete secrecy at NASA's Wallops Flight Facility in Virginia by Swift Engineering and BaySys Technologies. Swift Engineering had been tasked with designing and building a single-engine business jet in just 200 days, up to the aircraft's first flight. The prototype aircraft has 60% parts commonality with its larger Eclipse 500 sibling.

When the prototype was initially unveiled the company said that it did not intend to produce the aircraft.

Eclipse CEO Vern Raburn said:

On 30 May 2008, Eclipse Aviation began taking orders for a production version of the ECJ, the Eclipse 400. The 400 was at that time priced at $1.35 million and deliveries were expected to begin by the fourth quarter in 2011.

At AirVenture in July 2008, new Eclipse CEO Roel Pieper confirmed that if sufficient orders were placed for the 400, production would commence in 2011. Pieper also stated: "If there's not sufficient interest we'll give their (deposits) back...The 400 will get a very specific program. It will not be allowed to influence the 500 in any way."

In August 2008 in a communication to position holders, the company indicated that development of the Eclipse 400 was on hold. In October 2008 when asked "if the Eclipse 400 project was a go or not, Eclipse said it has not begun the certification process. The company also said it has not spent any of the deposit money for the four-place, single-engine VLJ."

In October 2008 industry analysts The Teal Group and Forecast International both issued independent analyses indicating that Eclipse faced bankruptcy by the end of the first quarter of 2009 and this development was expected to terminate development of the Eclipse 400. Eclipse Aviation entered Chapter 11 bankruptcy on 25 November 2008. Even though the purchase agreements for Eclipse 400s stated that the US$100,000 deposit was refundable upon request anytime before November 2009, reports in December 2008 indicated that deposits were not refunded upon request and that the company did not return phone calls on the subject.

Court documents filed by Eclipse 400 position holders as part of the bankruptcy hearings allege that the company misappropriated the US$3.2M collected from depositors, did not escrow it as contracted to do so and refused to refund it when required to. The assets of the company were sold to EclipseJet Aviation International by court order on 23 January 2009 and the fate of the deposits became the subject of an adversarial court action at that time. The sale to EclipseJet was not completed and the company entered Chapter 7 liquidation, the company assets, including the Eclipse 400 prototype, going to Eclipse Aerospace. That predecessor company merged into a new company in 2015, One Aviation, which subsequently went bankrupt in 2021 without ever pursuing development of the Eclipse 400.

Specifications
Reference: Eclipse website

References

External links

 Former location of the Eclipse Concept Jet website
 Eclipse ECJ Interior Photos
 Single Engine Eclipse First Flight Photos

400
2000s United States civil utility aircraft
Very light jets
V-tail aircraft
Abandoned civil aircraft projects of the United States
Single-engined jet aircraft
Low-wing aircraft
Aircraft first flown in 2007